Florian Dan Lăcustă  (born 22 March 1977 in Piteşti) is a retired Romanian footballer.

Club career
Lăcustă has appeared in 160 Romanian Liga I matches and 71 Moldovan National Division matches over his 16-year football career. He joined Ceahlăul Piatra Neamţ in January 2007. In September 2007, he returned to FC Argeş Piteşti, where manager Ionuţ Badea expected him to be a powerful and experienced central defender for the club.

He appeared in four qualifying matches for the 2005–06 UEFA Champions League with FC Sheriff Tiraspol.

International career
Lăcustă has made three appearances for the senior Romania national football team. He made his debut in a friendly match against Algeria on 8 December 2000. He played in one qualifying match for the 2002 FIFA World Cup, a 1–1 draw against Georgia on 6 October 2001.

Honours
FC Argeş Piteşti
 Liga II: 1993–94, 2007–08
FC Sheriff Tiraspol
 Divizia Naţională: 2003–04, 2004–05, 2006–07
 Moldovan Cup: 1999
 Moldovan Super Cup: 2004, 2005

References

External links
 
 

1977 births
Living people
Sportspeople from Pitești
Romanian footballers
Association football defenders
Romania international footballers
FC Astra Giurgiu players
FC Sheriff Tiraspol players
CSM Ceahlăul Piatra Neamț players
FC Argeș Pitești players
Romanian expatriate sportspeople in Moldova
FC Vaslui players
Liga I players
Expatriate footballers in Moldova
Romanian expatriate footballers